Rathmines Athletic Football Club were an Irish association football club based in Rathmines, Dublin. Together with YMCA, Frankfort and Reds United, Rathmines Athletic are one of only four clubs to have played just one season in the top level of the League of Ireland. The 1922–23 season saw Rathmines Athletic finish in 12th and last place and withdraw from the league without playing their last game.

History

League of Ireland
The 1922–23 season saw the League of Ireland expand from eight to twelve teams. After Frankfort and YMCA dropped out, Rathmines Athletic became one of six new teams to join the league. The others were Shamrock Rovers, Shelbourne United, Pioneers, Athlone Town and Midland Athletic. Rathmines Athletic and Shelbourne United originally had their applications to join the league rejected at a meeting on 17 August 1922. They were only reconsidered after one of the original proposed expansion teams, University College Dublin, dropped out after concerns about their ability to field a team throughout the season. In their final league game Rathmines Athletic were due to play Dublin United. However they resigned from the league without playing the match. The match was later awarded as a win for Dublin United. In the 1922–23 FAI Cup Rathmines Athletic were drawn in the first round against Fordsons but the latter team were awarded a walkover.

League of Ireland Stats

Source:

Top Scorers

Source:

References

Association football clubs in Dublin (city)
Defunct League of Ireland clubs
Athletic
Association football clubs disestablished in 1923
1923 disestablishments in Ireland